Starry Night is an oil-on-canvas painting created by the Expressionist artist Edvard Munch in 1893. This night landscape represents the coastline at Åsgårdstrand, a small beach resort south of Oslo in Norway, where Edvard Munch had spent his summers since the late 1880s. In this painting Munch shows the view from the hotel window, where he fell in love for the first time.

References

Paintings by Edvard Munch
1893 paintings
Paintings in the collection of the J. Paul Getty Museum
Water in art